Patria Nueva (New Fatherland) was a period in the history of Chile that began with the victory of Ejército de los Andes in the Battle of Chacabuco on 12 February 1817 and ended with the resignation of Bernardo O'Higgins as Supreme Director in 1823.

Government of Bernardo O'Higgins

First measures as Supreme Director 
Not long after becoming the Supreme Director of Chile, O'Higgins sent the Aguila, a ship captured in the port of Valparaiso, to rescue Chilean patriots stranded on the Juan Fernández Islands. O'Higgins formed an army to face the Spanish Empire forces hidden in the port of Talcahuano and the montoneras (traitor patriots, natives and bandits), who were on the shore of the Bio-Bio River.

He created the Vindication Tribunal, a legal apparatus that granted patriots the right to reclaim goods taken by the Spanish during the Reconquest. He also ordered the exile of priests advocating for continued fealty to the Spanish throne.

The surprise of Cancha Rayada 
The independent people waited in Talca for the royalists, but the royalists took another path.  San Martin and O'Higgins were caught by surprise.

In Santiago fear had spread with the defeat of the Ejército de los Andes and the Chilean army. Many people in Santiago were already going into self-imposed exile again in Mendoza. Rumors of the deaths of O'Higgins and San Martin spread rapidly.

In these circumstances, in the cabildo of 23 March, Manuel Rodríguez yelled "We still have our homeland, citizens!" and proclaimed himself the supreme director. He created a squadron called Húsares de la Muerte. It attracted many "carreristas", swearing to die before seeing the homeland in the hands of Spain again. Knowing this, O'Higgins went back to Santiago against medical advice and accompanied by San Martin. Both were welcomed with cannon shots on the sunrise of 24 March.

Consolidation and progress of the Independence Movement 
Despite having signed the Declaration of Independence, Chile and Argentina experienced unstable independence attributable to the presence of the Royalists in Peru. San Martín continued his planned invasion of Peru with the added support of O'Higgins. Organized in 1820 by the government of Chile, the Freedom Expedition of Peru, led by Commanding General José de San Martín and Lord Thomas Cochrane, was one of the central forces leading to the Peruvian War of Independence. In 1822, San Martin retired from the campaign, resigning as Protector of Peru. Simon Bolivar took his place, backed by the Colombian government, and continued to fight for Peru's independence.

Cochrane would settle the decisive blow to the Royalists in Chile when, in 1820, he seized the Valdivian Fort System, the most fortified place in South America at the time. Cochrane succeeded in the Capture of Valdivia using a surprise land assault. He then sent a small force in charge of Jorge Beauchef to pursue the Royalist army fleeing from Valdivia to Chiloe and, in the process, conquered the cities located further south of Valdivia - including Me Río Bueno and Osorno.

After the capture of Valdivia, Lord Cochrane left Colonel Jorge Beauchef as commander and governor of Valdivia. On 6 March 1820, Colonel Beauchef overcame the royalists during the battle of El Toro. From Valdivia, Cochrane went to Chiloe. He failed in a ground attack on Ancud and was forced to retreat. After the battle of El Toro, he began to consolidate his army's presence in the southern Chilean region, excluding Chiloé.

See also 
Chilean War of Independence

1810s in Chile
1820s in Chile